Juan Fernández Blanco (born 17 August 1995), known as Juan Ibiza, is a Spanish footballer who plays as a central defender for UD Ibiza.

Club career
Born in Ibiza, Balearic Islands, Ibiza joined Villarreal CF's youth setup at the age of eleven. He made his senior debut with the C-team on 30 August 2014, starting in a 1–3 Tercera División home loss against CD Castellón.

Ibiza scored his first goals on 24 April 2016, netting a brace in a 3–2 home win against CD Acero. Ahead of the 2016–17 season, he was promoted to the reserves in Segunda División B.

On 16 July 2018, Ibiza was loaned to Segunda División side UD Almería for one year, with a buyout clause. He made his first-team debut on 26 August, coming on as a late substitute for goalscorer Luis Rioja in a 1–1 home draw against CD Tenerife in the Segunda División.

On 10 July 2019, Ibiza joined the Rojiblancos permanently on a three-year contract, after the club activated his buyout clause. On 24 September of the following year, after featuring rarely due to injuries, he was loaned to fellow second division side CE Sabadell FC for the 2020–21 campaign.

Ibiza scored his first professional goal on 1 November 2020, netting the opener in a 3–0 away win over SD Ponferradina. On 31 August of the following year, he terminated his contract with Almería, and signed a two-year deal with fellow second division side UD Ibiza just hours later.

References

External links

1995 births
Living people
Footballers from Ibiza
Spanish footballers
Association football defenders
Segunda División players
Segunda División B players
Tercera División players
Villarreal CF C players
Villarreal CF B players
UD Almería players
CE Sabadell FC footballers
UD Ibiza players